Kamunyak (meaning "Blessed One"), was a lioness in the Samburu National Reserve, in Northern Kenya.

She is famous for having adopted at least 6 oryx calves, and fighting off predators and lion prides which attempted to eat her charges.  She suffered starvation, since the calves did not act like lion cubs and wait somewhere while she hunted for food.  

Her story was recorded by Saba Douglas-Hamilton and her sister, Dudu, between January 2002 - August 2003. Their film, Heart of a Lioness, was first shown on the BBC and later premiered in the United States on Animal Planet in March 2005. Video clips from this film can be accessed on the Discovery Channel website, together with audio interviews with pictures and an extensive discussion.

She was last sighted in February 2004, and despite a number of searches, has not been seen since.

See also
 Owen and Mzee, a hippopotamus and a tortoise
 List of individual cats

External links
Saba & Dudu Douglas-Hamilton website - produced a film "Heart of a Lioness" based on Kamunyak's story
discovery.com - Animal Planet fansite for Heart of a Lioness, including videos, interviews and discussion
Magical Kenya News Article - 7 January 2002
Magical Kenya News Article - 18 February 2002
Magical Kenya News Article - 11 March 2002
Magical Kenya News Article - 1 April 2002
Magical Kenya News Article - 10 October 2002
Magical Kenya News Article
Carte Blanche Interactive article - 2 March 2003

Environment of Kenya
Individual animals in Kenya
Individual lions
Individual wild animals
Motherhood